Richard T. Notkin (born October 1948 in Chicago, Illinois) is an American ceramic artist. He earned a BFA from Kansas City Art Institute in 1970, studying under Ken Ferguson.  In 1973, he received his MFA from the University of California, Davis, where he studied under Robert Arneson.

Notkin lives and works in Washington State but formerly was based in Helena, Montana and is especially known for his reinterpretations of traditional Yixing pottery. His work consistently reflects anti-war and pro-environmentalist themes. His works are often sculptural interpretations of classic ceramic forms like teapots and tile-based murals, but without any functional aspect. His work features a high level of surface detail made with the assistance of complex plaster molds, magnifiers, and a variety of small scale tools.

References
 Guangzhen, Zhou "Po" (1997). American Ceramic Artists Today. Beijing, The People's Fine Art Publishing House. 
 Martin, Andrew J. (2006). The Essential Guide to Mold Making and Slip Casting. New York, Lark Books. 
 The Western Spokesman of Yixing-Richard Notkin, Ceramic Art, V.31, 90–93.
 Lokau, Walter H: "Postmodern Moralities - About Richard T. Notkin, Ceramic Artist", pg. 8–13, New Ceramics, (Feb 2006).

1948 births
Living people
American ceramists
Modern sculptors
American potters
Artists from Chicago
Kansas City Art Institute alumni
University of California, Davis alumni
Sculptors from Illinois